Yoan Makoundou (born 9 August 2000) is a French professional basketball player for AS Monaco of the LNB Pro A and the EuroLeague.

Early life and youth career
Makoundou began playing basketball with his local club US Melun and moved to Marne-la-Vallée Basket in 2016. One year later, he joined the youth academy of Cholet Basket. He helped his team win titles in the LNB Espoirs, the French under-21 league, in 2018 and 2019.

Professional career
On 10 July 2020, Makoundou signed his first professional contract, a three-year deal with Cholet of the LNB Pro A. On 20 January 2021, he recorded 20 points and eight rebounds in an 89–71 loss to Hapoel Holon. After averaging 10.4 points and 5.2 rebounds per game in the 2020–21 Basketball Champions League, he was named Champions League Best Young Player.

Makoundou inked a four-year deal with AS Monaco on July 23, 2022.

National team career
Makoundou represented France at the 2019 FIBA Under-19 Basketball World Cup in Greece. He averaged four points and 2.4 rebounds per game, helping his team win the bronze medal.

References

External links
 Cholet Basket bio

2000 births
Living people
21st-century French people
AS Monaco Basket players
Cholet Basket players
French men's basketball players
Power forwards (basketball)
Sportspeople from Melun